Céline Marthe Ratsiraka is a Malagasy politician, political figure, and widow of former President Didier Ratsiraka. Ratsiraka is the longest tenured First Lady of Madagascar in the country's history, having held the position from 1975 to 1993 and from 1997 until 2002. She was an influential figure within the ruling Association for the Rebirth of Madagascar (AREMA) from the 1970s to the 1990s, especially within the party's left-wing.

Biography
Ratsiraka was born Céline Velonjara. She was the daughter of Pascal Velonjara, a parliamentarian during the French colonial period and founder of the Parti des déshérités de Madagascar (PADESM).

In 1964, she married Didier Ratsiraka, a young naval officer, at a Catholic ceremony presided over by Father Armand Gaëtan Razafindratandra. The couple had four children: three daughters - Olga, Sophie, Annick - and one son, Xavier.

Didier Ratsiraka took power in 1975 as President of the Supreme Revolutionary Council. During the rule of her husband from 1975 until 1993, Céline Ratsiraka became an influential figure in Malagasy politics and the regime's AREMA party as first lady and wife of the president. Céline Ratsiraka and her sister, Hortense Raveloson Mahasampo, lead the left-wing of the AREMA party, which acted as a counterbalance to figures within the party's right flank, such as Pascal Rakotomavo and Rakotovao Razakaboana. Ratsiraka and her sister also organized and led the party's women's wing, known as AREMA Women. Additionally, Céline Ratsiraka also headed AREMA's cooperative movement, including an investment bureau called the PROCOOP.

Didier and Céline Ratsiraka went into exile in France in July 2002, ending a seven month political crisis following the disputed 2001 presidential election between Ratsiraka and the eventual winner, Marc Ravalomanana.

In April 2013, the Ratsirakas returned to Madagascar after living in exile in France for eleven years so her husband could contest the 2013 presidential election. Ratsiraka was removed from the race by the electoral court in August 2013 for missing the six-month residency deadline.

On 22 March 2021, both Céline Ratsiraka and her husband were admitted to Soavinandriana Military Hospital (CENHOSOA) in Antananarivo, for treatment of a "small flu", according to their relatives. Didier Ratsiraka died at the hospital from cardiac arrest several days later on 28 March 2021, at the age of 84.

References

Date of birth unknown
Year of birth unknown
First ladies of Madagascar
Malagasy women in politics
Association for the Rebirth of Madagascar politicians
Malagasy exiles